Shan Shek Wan is a village in the south of Lantau Island, in Hong Kong.

Administration
Shan Shek Wan is a recognized village under the New Territories Small House Policy.

Geography
Shan Shek Wan is located near the coast of Pui O Wan, north of South Lantau Road, and west of Pui O.

References

Villages in Islands District, Hong Kong
Lantau Island